Richard H. Ledgett Jr. is a former Deputy Director of the National Security Agency.

Education
Ledgett has an undergraduate degree in psychology and a graduate degree in strategic intelligence.

Career
In 1988, he began working for the National Security Agency, where he served in a variety of positions in the cybersecurity division.

Previous positions at NSA included Deputy Director for Analysis and Production (2009–2010), Deputy Director for Data Acquisition (2006–2009), Assistant Deputy Director for Data Acquisition (2005–2006), and Chief, NSA/CSS Pacific (2002–2005).

From 2012 to 2013 he was the Director of the NSA/CSS Threat Operations Center, responsible for round-the-clock cryptologic activities to discover and counter adversary cyber efforts.

From June 2013 to his appointment as Deputy Director in January 2014, Ledgett headed the investigation of leaks regarding NSA surveillance programs made by Edward Snowden.

On February 3, 2017, Ledgett announced that he would be retiring in the spring. His successor was George C. Barnes.

In October 2020, Ledgett signed a letter stating the Biden laptop story “has the classic earmarks of a Russian information operation 

On August 15, 2017, Ledgett was elected to M&T Bank Corporation's Board of Directors.

Statements regarding NSA surveillance
Ledgett pledged increased transparency regarding NSA operations. He defended the operations of the NSA and argued in a rare interview with Reuters that NSA operations are completely legal. Ledgett also accused the media of sensationalizing reports about various NSA mass surveillance programs.

In March 2014, Ledgett stated during a TED Talk that the NSA operates legally. He further argued that President James Madison would be proud of the way in which Constitutional checks and balances have governed NSA mass surveillance.

Awards and decorations

References

External links
 
 "The NSA responds to Edward Snowden’s TED Talk" (TED2014)

Year of birth missing (living people)
Living people
Deputy Directors of the National Security Agency
National Security Agency people